Polyetherketones (PEK for short) are polymers whose molecular backbone contain alternating ketone (R-CO-R) and Ether (R-O-R) functionalities. The most common are Polyaryletherketones (PAEK), in which there is an aryl group linked in the (1–4)-position between each of the functional groups. The backbone, which is thus very rigid, gives the materials very high glass transition and melting temperatures compared to other plastics.

Synthesis 

Polyetherketones can be obtained by condensation of 4,4′-difluorobenzophenone and potassium or sodium salt of hydroquinone:

Types 
The most common of these high-temperature resistant materials is polyetheretherketone (PEEK).

Other types of polyetherketone are:

 PEKK = Polyetherketoneketone
 PEEKK = Polyether ether ketone ketone
 PEKEKK = Polyetherketoneetherketoneketone

Applications 
Space and aviation: aircraft parts (fins, wing flaps, nose caps, seats). Replacements for metal parts, also in the military field.

Machinery and automotive industry: high-performance molded parts such as bearing cages, gears, sealing rings, valve spring retainers, impellers. Coatings when high resistance to temperatures above 200 °C is required. Coatings made of PEEK or PEK, for example, are suitable for applications up to 230 °C (450 °F).

Electronics industry: wire and cable sheathing, flexible printed circuit boards, semiconductor production, offshore connectors.

Medical technology: endoscope handles, hip joint prostheses. Because polyetherketones can be sterilized without damaging them, PEK is often used for surgical applications.

Properties 
PEK has a high temperature resistance. It is also characterized by high wear resistance. In addition, polyetherketones are highly resistant to chemicals: They are resistant to non-oxidizing acids, grease, lubricants, water vapor, hot water, and concentrated alkalis.

Literature 

 Beland, S. (1990). High performance thermoplastic resins and their composites. William Andrew.
 Díez-Pascual, A. M., Naffakh, M., Marco, C., Ellis, G., & Gómez-Fatou, M. A. (2012). High-performance nanocomposites based on polyetherketones. Progress in Materials Science, 57(7), 1106–1190.

References 

Ethers
Ketones
Polymers